A Personal Journey is the first album by the Australian heavy metal band Lord. This release was designed as a solo outlet for Lord Tim of the Sydney metal band Dungeon to release material he felt was inappropriate for that group.

Overview
The tracks on A Personal Journey are a mixture of instrumentals and songs. The ex-Dungeon bass guitarist Justin Sayers and Dungeon guitarist Stu Marshall also contributed. Track 5, "By George!", is a tribute to the Dokken guitarist George Lynch. The album was released in 2003 by the Melbourne label Metal Warriors before being remixed and reissued with an extra track, "The Duel" (a reworking of an early Dungeon song), by Modern Invasion in December 2004. When Dungeon split up that year, Lord became a complete band and has since recorded further albums.

Track listing
All titles by Tim Grose

2005 Remastered Edition Reissue Bonus track

Personnel

 Musical
Lord
 Lord Tim – vocals, guitars, bass guitar, keyboards, drum programming

with
 Justin Lesley – bass guitar
 Stuart Marshall – backing vocals
 Gustav Hoffmann – harpsichord (on 8), backing vocals

 Technical
(Producer, engineer, mixer, etc.)

 Graphical
(Cover art, sleeve design, photos, etc.)

Lord (band) albums
2003 debut albums